Jaworsko  is a village in the administrative district of Gmina Dębno, within Brzesko County, Lesser Poland Voivodeship, in southern Poland.

References

Web Page of Jaworsko village -

Forum of Jaworsko village - 

Jaworsko